Gulshan-e-Ghazi is a neighbourhood in the Karachi West district of Karachi, Pakistan, that previously was a part of Baldia Town until 2011.

There are several ethnic groups in Gulshan-e-Ghazi including Muhajirs, 
Hindko(Hazara)
Sindhis, Kashmiris, Seraikis, Pakhtuns, Balochis, 
Brahuis, Memons, Punjabis Bohras,  Ismailis, etc. Over 99% of the population is Muslim.

References

External links
 Karachi Website .

Baldia Town
Neighbourhoods of Karachi